Sappa Township may refer to one of the following places in the United States:

 Sappa Township, Decatur County, Kansas
 Sappa Township, Harlan County, Nebraska

Township name disambiguation pages